An ouzeri (Greek ουζερί ) is a type of Greek tavern which serves ouzo (a Greek liquor) and mezedes (small finger foods).

Sources
John Freely. Strolling through Athens: fourteen unforgettable walks through Europe's oldest city.  Tauris Parke Paperbacks, 2004 ,

Further reading
 

Greek cuisine
Types of drinking establishment
Restaurants by type